Żywocice  (German Zywodczütz) is a village in the administrative district of Gmina Krapkowice, within Krapkowice County, Opole Voivodeship, in south-western Poland.

The village has a population of 1,300.

Firstly mentioned as Ziboczicz in 1300.

Main sights 
 old cemetery closed in 1934. 
 old building of fire department (1885-1889) and fire truck from 1911. 
 two old wayside shrines 
 catholic church St. Florian built in 1989

References

Villages in Krapkowice County